Crataegus × vailiae is a hawthorn hybrid that primarily occurs in Virginia, Tennessee, North Carolina and Georgia. It appears to be a hybrid between C. uniflora and a member of series Macracanthae, probably C. calpodendron.

References

vailiae
Plant nothospecies